Harald Stormoen (born 6 October 1980) is a retired Norwegian footballer, that played for Kongsvinger and Sogndal as a midfielder.

Career
Stormoen was born in Alvdal and played for Alvdal IL while also playing for Norwegian youth national teams. He joined Kongsvinger IL in 1998, and played in the Norwegian Premier League in 1998 and 1999, before the team was relegated. Stormoen played a total of 189 league games for the club.

Stormoen joined second-tier team Sogndal in ahead of the 2008 season. After playing 27 matches for the club in the First Division, Stormoen decided to retire after the 2010 season.

References

1980 births
Living people
People from Alvdal
Norwegian footballers
Kongsvinger IL Toppfotball players
Sogndal Fotball players
Eliteserien players
Norwegian First Division players
Association football midfielders
Sportspeople from Innlandet